Chalcosyrphus pannonicus is a species of hoverfly in the family Syrphidae.

Distribution
Romania.

References

Eristalinae
Insects described in 1916
Diptera of Europe
Taxa named by Lorenz Oldenberg